WWE Revolution may refer to:
 WWE New Year's Revolution, an annual pay-per-view event produced by WWE
 NXT TakeOver: R Evolution, a 2014 pay-per-view event produced by WWE featuring the NXT brand 
 Divas Revolution, from Women in WWE

See also
 WWE Evolution, a 2018 pay-per-view event produced by WWE featuring all women wrestlers